The Lodo Alfano (roughly "Alfano Law"), named after Berlusconi's Minister of Justice Angelino Alfano, was an Italian law, valid between 2008 and 2009, granting immunity from prosecution to the four highest political offices in Italy (the President of the Republic, the two Speakers of the Houses of Parliament and the Prime Minister). It was widely criticized as a copy of the Lodo Schifani, declared unconstitutional in 2004, which was seen by critics as a law aimed primarily at stopping trials involving Silvio Berlusconi. 

The Lodo Alfano was declared unconstitutional by the Italian Constitutional Court in October 2009.

See also 
 Lodo Schifani

Notes

Law of Italy
Politics of Italy
Silvio Berlusconi